The Morgan Library & Museum, formerly the Pierpont Morgan Library, is a museum and research library in the Murray Hill neighborhood of Manhattan in New York City. It is situated at 225 Madison Avenue, between 36th Street to the south and 37th Street to the north.

The Morgan Library & Museum is composed of several structures. The main building was designed by Charles McKim of the firm of McKim, Mead and White, with an annex designed by Benjamin Wistar Morris. A 19th-century Italianate brownstone house at 231 Madison Avenue, built by Isaac Newton Phelps, is also part of the grounds. The museum and library also contains a glass entrance building designed by Renzo Piano and Beyer Blinder Belle. The main building and its interior is a New York City designated landmark and a National Historic Landmark, while the house at 231 Madison Avenue is a New York City landmark.

The site was formerly occupied by residences of the Phelps family, one of which banker J. P. Morgan had purchased in 1880. The Morgan Library was founded in 1906 to house Morgan's private library, which included manuscripts and printed books, as well as his collection of prints and drawings. The main building was constructed between 1902 and 1906 for $1.2 million. The library was made a public institution in 1924 by J. P. Morgan's son John Pierpont Morgan Jr., in accordance with his father's will, and the annex was constructed in 1928. The glass entrance building was added when Morgan Library & Museum was renovated in 2006.

History

Phelps Stokes/Dodge houses 
In the second half of the 19th century, the Morgan Library & Museum's site was occupied by four brownstone houses on the east side of Madison Avenue, between 36th Street to the south and 37th Street to the north. The houses were all built in 1852 or 1853 by members of the Phelps Stokes/Dodge family. All the houses were designed in an Italianate style with pink brownstone. The Madison Avenue houses, from north to south, were owned by Isaac Newton Phelps, William E. Dodge, and John Jay Phelps, while the 37th Street house was owned by George D. Phelps. The surrounding neighborhood of Murray Hill was not yet developed at the time, but began to grow after the American Civil War.

Isaac Newton Phelps's daughter Helen married Anson Phelps Stokes in 1865. Their son, architect Isaac Newton Phelps Stokes, was born in the Isaac Newton Phelps house at 231 Madison Avenue two years later. Helen Phelps inherited the house following her father's death. In 1888, she doubled the size of her house and added an attic to plans by architect R. H. Robertson.

Morgan estate 
Hartford, Connecticut-born banker John Pierpont Morgan was looking to buy his own house by 1880. He wished to live in Murray Hill, where many of his and his wife's friends and business contacts lived. Morgan sought to buy John Jay Phelps's house at 219 Madison Avenue, at the corner with 36th Street, which was offered for $225,000. He acquired the house in 1881 and renovated it over the following two years. The exterior was largely retained to harmonize with the other houses, owned by the Phelpses and Dodge, but the interior was extensively renovated by the Herter Brothers. During this time, Morgan began to amass a large collection of fine art, inspired by that of his father Junius Spencer Morgan. The art was stored in his house in England to avoid import taxes. J. P. Morgan also began collecting rare books and other bindings upon his nephew Junius's suggestion; since books were not subject to import taxes, they were stored in the basement of his New York residence.

In subsequent years, Morgan became one of the most influential financiers in the United States. J. P. Morgan's collection began to grow quickly after his father died in 1890. While part of Morgan's collection was stored in the basement of his house, other items were loaned or placed in storage. By 1900, the plots north and east of J. P. Morgan's house became available for sale after the death of Melissa Stokes Dodge, who lived in the Dodge mansion just north of Morgan's house. On the far eastern side of that plot, McKim, Mead & White designed a six-story house at 33 East 36th Street for Morgan's daughter Louisa and her husband Herbert Satterlee. The Satterlees' house was made of limestone, as contrasted with the brownstones on Madison Avenue. It was connected to Morgan's own home by tunnels.

Morgan acquired William E. Dodge's home in April 1903. While the Satterlee house was under construction, the couple moved into the Dodge mansion; afterward, it was razed and replaced with a garden designed by Beatrix Farrand. By December 1904, Morgan had also purchased the old Isaac Newton Stokes house at 229 Madison Avenue for his son J. P. Morgan Jr., who was known as "Jack". When Jack Morgan and his wife Jane finally moved into 229 Madison Avenue in 1905, he commissioned a major renovation of the interior and renumbered it as 231 Madison Avenue. Jack Morgan also performed $1,900 in changes to the house's exterior.

Founding of library

Construction 

Morgan's book collection took up more space than could fit in his residence by 1900. On 36th Street, between his residence and the Satterlee house, Morgan initially hired Warren and Wetmore to design a Baroque-style library. After rejecting Warren and Wetmore's plans, Morgan hired Charles McKim of McKim, Mead & White to design the library in 1902. C. T. Wills was hired as the builder. The library was to be a classical marble structure with a simple design; Morgan had told McKim that "I want a gem". Whitney Warren of Warren and Wetmore had then just completed the elaborately decorated New York Yacht Club Building, and Morgan's preference for an austere structure may have led him to reject Warren and Wetmore.

Morgan and McKim planned the library's design for two years and, while McKim was responsible for the overall design, Morgan had final say over the aspects of the plan. An initial proposal for the design entailed building a projecting central mass with two recessed wings on either side, which Morgan deemed to be unwieldy. The second version of the plan reduced the size of the central mass and added a recessed entrance. The final designs called for the front facades of either wing to be flush with the central mass. Morgan was insistent that the library be made of marble, even though he was fine with giving brownstone residences to the rest of his family except for his daughter Louisa. Construction began in April 1903, and the library was being dubbed as "Mr. Morgan's jewel case" by 1904. Morgan acquired two hundred cases of books, which were temporarily stored in the Lenox Library and moved to Morgan's personal library starting in December 1905. Around the same time, Morgan hired Belle da Costa Greene as his personal librarian.

The Wall Street Journal reported in June 1906, when the library was near completion, that Morgan had "wanted the most perfect structure that human hands could erect and was willing to pay whatever it cost". For example, the usage of dry masonry marble blocks, an uncommon construction method in which masonry blocks were shaved precisely to remove the need for joints made of mortar, added $50,000 to the cost of construction. McKim had suggested the dry masonry blocks to Morgan after having unsuccessfully tried to place a knife blade in the joints of Athens's Erechtheion, and he ordered a plaster cast from his former employee Gorham Stevens, who worked in Athens. Morgan was impressed with the quality of the work, as McKim would recall in a February 1906 letter to his colleague, Stanford White. Even so, Morgan often upheld the library as an accomplishment of McKim's. The final design was more representative of the work of William M. Kendall from McKim, Mead & White.

Opening and early years 
Morgan began to use his office in November 1906 with a reception for the Metropolitan Museum of Art's purchasing committee. The details were not completed until January 1907, and the Morgan collection was relocated into the library later that year. Morgan's library had cost $1.2 million (equivalent to $ million in ). Several publications praised the completed library. In 1906, the Real Estate Record and Guide wrote of McKim, Mead & White: "the new Morgan Library, in Thirty-sixth street, is among their most carefully studied designs." The library building was described in another publication as "one of the Seven Wonders of the Edwardian World". A correspondent for the London Times, in 1908. characterized John Pierpont Morgan as "probably the greatest collector of things splendid and beautiful and rare who has ever lived". During the Panic of 1907, Morgan used his library to convene a meeting among the city's major financial figures, with bank presidents meeting in the east room and trust company presidents in the west room. To find a solution to halt the panic, he locked his guests in the library overnight, and his secretary relayed messages between the two rooms.

Morgan continued to collect material for his private library until his death in March 1913. His estate was valued at $128 million (about $ billion in ), over half of which lay in the worth of his collection. J. P. Morgan's will bequeathed the art collection to Jack, with the request that Jack make the collection "permanently available for the instruction and pleasure of the American people". The month after J. P. Morgan's death, the New York state legislature granted a two-year exemption enabling Jack to import his father's overseas collection without having to pay import duties. However, Jack Morgan sold off much of the overseas collection rather than importing it. During 1914, the collection was displayed in full at the Metropolitan Museum of Art, the only time the whole collection was displayed.

The import duty exemption expired in April 1915, and Jack sold various items in the collection to pay the inheritance taxes and to raise money for the cash bequests in his father's will. The taxes were substantial, totaling $7.5 million in 1916. Frances Morgan, Jack's mother and John Pierpont's widow, continued to live at J. P. Morgan's old residence until her death in November 1924.

Public institution and expansion

Incorporation and mid-20th century 
Jack and Jane Morgan continued to employ da Costa Greene as the librarian, expanding the collection with items in which they were personally interested. In March 1924, the Pierpont Morgan Library was incorporated as a public institution. The Morgans transferred the library's building, and the land under J. P. and Frances Morgan's old residence at 219 Madison Avenue, to the Pierpont Morgan Library. The move came as, despite Jack's opposition, the surrounding stretch of Madison Avenue was being redeveloped as a business street. By 1927, the library was planning to double its area; the old J. P. Morgan residence was being demolished to make way for the annex. The plans called for an expanded two-story Italianate style structure designed by Benjamin Wistar Morris, with space for offices, exhibitions, and a research library. The annex, made of the same Tennessee marble as the original, was completed in 1928. While architectural historian Robert A. M. Stern said the addition "did not frame McKim's jewel box so much as sidle up to it like an unattractive sibling", Norval White and Elliot Willensky thought the annex "modestly defers to its master".

Jack Morgan continued to live at 231 Madison Avenue until his death in 1943; his wife had died in 1925. Subsequently, the United Lutheran Church in America bought that house for its headquarters, and built a five-story annex in 1957. Next door, the Pierpont Morgan Library continued to expand its collections. The Fellows of The Pierpont Morgan Library was formed in 1949 to raise funds for the collections and distribute funds to scholars and publications. In the following decade, the Pierpont Morgan Library started to host concerts and tours. In 1960, the main library and its annex were connected by a cloister structure. The renovation, designed by J. P. Morgan's nephew Alexander P. Morgan, was completed in 1962 and included office space, a gallery, and meeting space.

The Phelps Stokes/Morgan house was designated by the New York City Landmarks Preservation Commission (LPC) in 1965 as one of the first structures to be protected under New York City's Landmarks Law. Next door, the LPC designated the exterior of the library's main building as a city landmark in 1966, and that structure was declared a National Historic Landmark the same year. However, the Lutheran Church had hoped to erect an office structure on the site of the Phelps Stokes/Morgan house and heavily opposed the house's designation. As a result, in 1974, the landmark status was removed from that house following a New York Court of Appeals ruling. The Pierpont Morgan Library constructed a five-story,  addition to the annex in 1975 to plans by Platt, Wyckoff & Coles; the addition was intended to house storage vaults and offices. In 1982, the main library building's interior was designated a city landmark.

Late 20th century to present 
In 1988, the Pierpont Morgan Library bought 231 Madison Avenue from the Lutheran Church. The garden between the house and the main building's annex was redeveloped with a glass conservatory designed by Voorsanger and Mills. The conservatory, the first major expansion to the Pierpont Morgan Library since the completion of Morris's annex, was finished in 1991 and connected the two structures. The house became the Pierpont Morgan Library's bookstore. In 1999, the Morgan opened a drawing center on the second floor of the annex, designed by Beyer Blinder Belle. The same year, the Morgan received $10 million from Eugene V. Thaw and Clare E. Thaw; these funds were used to establish the Thaw Conservation Center in 2002.

By 2001, there were plans to expand the Pierpont Morgan Library. The library presented preliminary plans to the LPC in 2002, in which it would build a new structure between 231 Madison Avenue and the original library's annex, to be designed by Italian architect Renzo Piano and Beyer Blinder Belle. The commission also sought to restore landmark status to 231 Madison Avenue, a move the library did not oppose. In 2003, the Pierpont Morgan Library's buildings were closed for construction and expansion. In the interim, it sponsored numerous traveling exhibitions around the country. The library reopened on April 29, 2006, as the Morgan Library & Museum. With the completion of the renovation, the private office and vault of J. P. Morgan was also opened to the public. A restoration of the main building's interior spaces was completed in 2010.

The Morgan Library & Museum announced a four-year restoration of the main building's facade in February 2019, the first in the building's history. As part of the project, the landscape designer Todd Longstaffe-Gowan designed a garden surrounding the original library building. The LPC had initially expressed opposition to the construction of the garden, as there had not been a garden around the original Morgan Library. The agency approved the project after reviewing letters and other correspondences from J. P. Morgan, who had indicated that he had indeed wanted a garden around the library. In addition, Integrated Conservation Resources restored the main building. The project cost $13 million in total. The renovation was completed in 2022.

Collection

Manuscripts 

The most internationally significant part of the Morgan Library and Museum's collection is its relatively small but very select collection of illuminated manuscripts. Among the more famous manuscripts are the Morgan Bible, Morgan Beatus, Hours of Catherine of Cleves, Farnese Hours, Morgan Black Hours, and Codex Glazier. The Morgan holds a copy of the letter written by Andrea Corsali from India in 1516; this letter, one of five in existence, contains the first description of the Southern Cross.

The manuscript collection also contains authors' original manuscripts, including some by Sir Walter Scott and Honoré de Balzac. Other objects include a Percy Bysshe Shelley notebook; writings from Émile Zola; originals of poems by Robert Burns; a unique Charles Dickens manuscript of A Christmas Carol with handwritten edits and markup from the author; and a journal by Henry David Thoreau. There are also writings from George Sand, William Makepeace Thackeray, Lord Byron, and Charlotte Brontë, as well as manuscripts of nine of Sir Walter Scott's novels, including Ivanhoe.

The Morgan's musical manuscript collection is second in size only behind the Library of Congress. These include autographed and annotated libretti and scores from Beethoven, Brahms, Chopin, Mahler and Verdi, and Mozart's Haffner Symphony in D Major. The collection also contains the scraps of paper on which Bob Dylan jotted down "Blowin' in the Wind" and "It Ain't Me Babe". It also contains a considerable collection of Victoriana, including one of the most important collections of Gilbert and Sullivan manuscripts and related artifacts.

Books and prints 
The Morgan contains a large collection of incunabula, prints, and drawings of European artists, namely Leonardo, Michelangelo, Raphael, Rembrandt, Rubens, Gainsborough, Dürer, and Picasso. The collection includes early printed Bibles, among them three Gutenberg Bibles. There are also many examples of fine bookbinding in the collection. Felice Stampfle was appointed the first Curator of Drawings and Prints at the Morgan Library in 1945.

The Morgan also contains material from ancient Egypt and medieval liturgical objects (including Coptic literature examples); William Blake's original drawings for his edition of the Book of Job; and concept drawings for The Little Prince by Antoine de Saint-Exupéry. The Morgan has one of the world's greatest collections of ancient Near Eastern cylinder seals, small stone cylinders finely engraved with images for transfer to clay by rolling.

Artwork and other collections 
The collection still includes some Old Master paintings collected by Morgan between 1907 and 1911 (works by Hans Memling, Perugino, and Cima da Conegliano). However, this has never been the collection's focus, and Ghirlandaio's masterpiece Portrait of Giovanna Tornabuoni was sold to Thyssen when the Great Depression worsened the Morgan family's finances. The Morgan also holds medieval artworks such as the Stavelot Triptych and the metalwork covers of the Lindau Gospels.

Other notable artists of the Morgan Library and Museum are Jean de Brunhoff, Paul Cézanne, Vincent van Gogh, John Leech, Gaston Phoebus, Rembrandt van Rijn, and John Ruskin. In 2018, the Morgan acquired the drawing Bathers by Renoir, a previously unexhibited work.

Architecture

Main building 
The main building (also known as the McKim Building), constructed between 1902 and 1906 as the original structure in the complex, was designed in the Classical Revival style by Charles Follen McKim of McKim, Mead & White. The 1928 annex to the building, designed by Benjamin Wistar Morris to harmonize with McKim's original, contains architectural detail differing from that of the original structure. The annex measures , with a later  addition.

Facade

The building has a facade of Tennessee marble. McKim took his inspiration from the Villa Giulia, particularly the attic of its Nymphaeum. Further inspiration came from the Villa Medici in Rome, constructed in the 16th century by Annibale Lippi. The exterior walls are made of dry masonry, which allowed the marble blocks to be set evenly, thus requiring a minimal amount of mortar. Tinfoil sheeting was placed between the blocks to prevent moisture buildup. Charles T. Wills was responsible for the dry masonry construction. The Wall Street Journal reported upon the library's completion, "No other building in Europe or America was ever erected with this care."

The main entrance is a Palladian arch at the center of the 36th Street facade. There are two recessed niches on that facade, one on each side of the entrance. The garden also contains pathways embedded with pebbles, which Sicilian craftsman Orazio Porto laid manually. 

The central archway contains a portico with a groin vaulted ceiling, supported by four Ionic columns, two on each side. A flight of steps, leading to the main entrance, is flanked by two lionesses sculpted by Edward Clark Potter, who would later create the two lions that guard the New York Public Library Main Branch. Above the entranceway are allegorical roundels and panels, which was originally given to Andrew O'Connor and then reassigned to Adolph Weinman after O'Connor could not complete his contract. These panels depict tragic and lyric poetry. The portico has a geometric mosaic tile floor with marble. Inside the portico is a pair of bronze doors, imported from Florence and made in the style of Lorenzo Ghiberti's doors at the Florence Baptistery. Each door contains five carved bronze panels, which depict allegorical scenes. The 36th Street facade contains six Doric style pilasters flanking the main entrance.

Interior

The interior of the main library building is richly decorated, with a polychrome rotunda. It leads to three public rooms: Morgan's private study to the west, the librarian's office to the north, and the original library to the east. The rotunda has a ceiling with murals and plasterwork inspired by Raphael, created by H. Siddons Mowbray. This ceiling contains themed murals in the lunette panels, which allude to material in Morgan's collection, as well as a central dome, which contains roundels and rectangular panels with various figures or motifs. The rotunda floors are clad with multicolored marble, the pattern of which is based on the floor of the Villa Pia in Vatican City. The walls contain mosaic baseboards and are separated into panels with vertical pilasters, topped by Composite style pilasters. The doorways to the rooms on the east and west are made of white marble, topped by marble entablatures and flanked by green marble columns.

The interior was designed with two rooms for exhibition. The East Library features triple-tiered bookcases, the upper tiers of which could only be accessed by balconies. On the east wall of the East Library is a fireplace with a tapestry showing the "Triumph of Avarice". The fireplace itself had been imported from Italy. Mowbray designed eighteen lunettes and spandrels atop each wall, modeled after the work of Pinturicchio. The figures in the lunettes alternate between allegorical female muses and notable artists, explorers, or teachers. Zodiac symbols are placed on the spandrels, as the signs of the zodiac were particularly important to J. P. Morgan. Particularly prominent are the zodiac signs over the entrance: Aries corresponds to J. P. Morgan's birth on April 17, 1837, and Gemini corresponds to his marriage to Frances Louisa Tracy on May 31, 1865. Two additional spandrels contain allegorical motifs that depict changing seasons. The East Library had three levels of shelves and is the largest room in the main library wing.

Morgan's study, now the West Library, was described by historian Wayne Andrews as "one of the greatest achievements of American interior decoration". The design of the study reflected Morgan's tastes; as his son-in-law Herbert Satterlee said, "No one could really know Mr. Morgan at all unless he had seen him in the West Room." The West Library contains low wooden bookshelves as well as a fireplace with a marble mantelpiece. The decorative elements include stained glass panels in the study's windows, as well as a wall covering of red damask. The current damask covering, a replica by Scalamandré, is a copy of a pattern that was displayed at Rome's Chigi Palace. The coffered ceiling was reportedly purchased in Italian cardinal's palace. The artist James Wall Finn painted coats-of-arms onto the ceiling based on Italian bookplates from Morgan's collection. Finn's work was designed in such an authentic manner that it was frequently mistaken as part of the ceiling's original design.

231 Madison Avenue 
Also part of the library grounds is 231 Madison Avenue, an Italianate brownstone house on the southeast corner of Madison Avenue and East 37th Street, which was the home of Isaac Newton Phelps  and later J. P. "Jack" Morgan Jr. The house contains the Morgan Shop on its northern side, facing 37th Street, and the Morgan Dining Room on its southern side. The house is set behind a barricade composed of a wrought-iron fence atop a brownstone ledge. The house was originally three stories tall and faced with pink stone, but after R. H. Robertson's renovation of 1888, became four stories tall with a raised basement. An office annex to the east, built in 1957, was originally faced with brick. Before the Morgan acquired it in 1988, it was a headquarters of the Lutheran Church.

The Madison Avenue facade consists of three vertical bays. An entrance stoop with a balustrade is on the Madison Avenue side of the structure, extending to a portico in the central bay, which is supported by a pair of Corinthian columns. On either side of the entrance doorway are rectangular sash windows, containing large sills with wrought-iron balustrades. The second and third stories each have three rectangular, multi-pane windows with sills atop console brackets. A cornice runs above the third story. The attic contains small Ionic colonettes, as well as rounded pediments atop two of the bays.

Along 37th Street, the water table containing the raised basement is topped by a molding. The original 1853 house to the west and the 1888 extension to the east are divided by a pier about halfway through the length of the facade, which spans the first through third stories. The original section of the house is three bays wide and contains window articulation similar to that of the Madison Avenue facade. On the first floor, the second opening from west has a balcony with an iron balustrade and a pediment supported by Corinthian columns. On the original second floor, the second bay from west is flanked by oval windows on either side, while the third bay from west is an oriel window. Within the 1888 extension, the first floor contains a projecting three-sided bay supported by pilasters and flanked by carved panels, as well as a blind arch opening to the east. The second floor of the extension contains paired window openings flanking a smaller triple window, while the third floor contains paired windows on either side of an oval window. The cornice above the third floor, as well as the attic, in both the original house and its extension is similar to that on Madison Avenue.

The southern facade of the house faces the rest of the library and is mostly obscured behind the 2006 addition. The westernmost portion of that facade, near Madison Avenue, contains rounded first- and second-story windows. There are also three-sided angled windows at the center of that facade.

Entrance building 

The most recent addition to the library, completed in 2006, is a four-story, steel-and-glass entrance building designed by Renzo Piano and Beyer Blinder Belle. The structure links McKim's library building, the annex, and the Phelps Stokes/Morgan house. There are four galleries in this section of the museum: the Clare Eddy Thaw Gallery, the Morgan Stanley Galleries West and East, and the Engelhard Gallery. The steel structural members are covered in rose-tinted paint as an allusion to the designs of main library and Phelps Stokes/Morgan house. Although externally "bland", the building helps to organize the interior spaces of the complex.

The entrance building contains the JPMorgan Chase Lobby just inside the main entrance. On the lobby's north wall, stairs lead up to the Morgan Shop and Morgan Dining Room, and there is an admission counter and coat room. The south wall has a corridor to the Marble Hall and the Morgan Stanley Galleries West and East, as well as stairs to the Engelhard Gallery on the second floor. The east wall of the lobby has a stair to the lower level as well as elevators to both the Engelhard Gallery and the second level.

Gilbert Court, a covered courtyard at the center of the complex, surrounds the entrance building on the north, east, and south. On the south wall of the court is the Clare Eddy Thaw Gallery, a  space inspired by Renaissance chambers that Piano observed in Italy. The facades of the new above-ground buildings contain pinkish steel-and-glass curtain walls, which were intended to recall the design of the earlier buildings. At the court's southeast corner, stairs lead up to the original Morgan Library building, connecting to a vestibule between Morgan's study (the West Library) and the rotunda. New storage rooms were also created by drilling into Manhattan's bedrock schist.

Management
The scope of the collection was initially curated by Belle da Costa Greene, who had been J. P. Morgan's personal librarian when the private library had been founded in 1905. When the Pierpont Morgan Library became a public institution, she became the library's first director until her retirement in 1948. The library's second director, Frederick Baldwin Adams Jr., served until 1969, when he was succeeded by Charles Ryskamp. Ryskamp, the third director, resigned in 1987 and was replaced by Charles Eliot Pierce Jr.

Pierce served as the fourth director of the Pierpont Morgan Library until 2008, when he announced his intention to retire. The library's fifth director, William M. Griswold, served between 2008 and 2015, during which he oversaw the growth of its collections, exhibition programs, and curatorial departments. In 2015, the Morgan named Colin Bailey as its sixth director.

References

Notes

Citations

Sources

External links 

Virtual tour of the Morgan Library & Museum provided by Google Arts & Culture

1906 establishments in New York City
Art museums and galleries in New York City
Morgan, J. P.

Historic house museums in New York City
Historic preservation organizations in the United States
House of Morgan
Libraries established in 1906
Libraries in Manhattan
Libraries on the National Register of Historic Places in Manhattan
Library buildings completed in 1906
Literary archives in the United States
Madison Avenue
McKim, Mead & White buildings
Murray Hill, Manhattan
Museums established in 1906
Museums in Manhattan
Museums of Ancient Near East in the United States
National Historic Landmarks in Manhattan
New York City Designated Landmarks in Manhattan
Rare book libraries in the United States
Renzo Piano buildings
Special collections libraries in the United States
Research libraries in the United States